Richard Rex is a historian.  He is the Professor of Reformation History at the Faculty of Divinity of the University of Cambridge.  He is also the Polkinghorne Fellow in Theology and Religious Studies at Queens' College, Cambridge, where he is Director of Studies in Theological and Religious Studies, Tutor for graduate students, and Deputy Senior Tutor.

He edited the editio princeps of Thomas Swinnerton's Tropes and Figures from a manuscript.

Books and publications

The Theology of John Fisher – 1991
Henry VIII and the English Reformation  – 1993
The Lollards – 2002
Lady Margaret Beaufort and her Professors of Divinity at Cambridge 1502 - 1649 – 2003
A Reformation rhetoric Thomas Swynnerton's The tropes and figures of scripture – 2004
The Tudors – 2006
The Making of Martin Luther – 2017

References

Year of birth missing (living people)
Living people
British historians
Fellows of Queens' College, Cambridge
Place of birth missing (living people)